Marcos Jackson Caicedo Caicedo (born 10 November 1991) is an Ecuadorian professional footballer who playsas a winger for C.S. Emelec.

International career

International goals
Scores and results list Ecuador's goal tally first.

References

External links
doradosfc.com.mx

1991 births
Living people
Ecuadorian footballers
Ecuador international footballers
Ecuadorian expatriate footballers
C.S. Emelec footballers
C.D. Nacional players
Club León footballers
Dorados de Sinaloa footballers
Mineros de Zacatecas players
Barcelona S.C. footballers
L.D.U. Quito footballers
Ecuadorian Serie A players
Liga MX players
Ascenso MX players
Association football wingers
Sportspeople from Guayaquil
Ecuadorian expatriate sportspeople in Mexico
Expatriate footballers in Mexico